The Messenger is a quarterly magazine published by the European Southern Observatory (ESO). It provides information about scientific, technical and other developments connected with the ESO.

See also
 Astronomy and Astrophysics
 Atacama Large Millimeter Array
 European Extremely Large Telescope
 La Silla Observatory
 Very Large Telescope

References

External links
 

1974 establishments in West Germany
Astronomy magazines
English-language magazines
European Southern Observatory
Magazines established in 1974
Magazines published in Munich
Quarterly magazines published in Germany